Since the early days of the Baptist movement, various denominations have adopted common confessions of faith as the basis for cooperative work among churches. The following is a list of confessions that have been important to the development of various Baptist churches throughout history.

1600s
 1611 Thomas Helwys Declaration of Faith
 1644 First London Baptist Confession - revised in 1646
 1651 The Faith and Practice of Thirty Congregations
 1654 The True Gospel-Faith Declared According to the Scriptures
 1656 The Somerset Confession of Faith
 1655 Midland Confession of Faith
 1660 The Standard Confession
 1678 The Orthodox Creed
 1689 Second London Baptist Confession - originally written in 1677
 1691 A Short Confession or a Brief Narrative of Faith

1700s
 1742 The Philadelphia Confession
 1757 Carter Lane Declaration of Faith
 1758 The Sandy Creek Confession
 1770 Articles of Religion of the New Connexion
 1788 The Coalheaver's Confession.
 1792 The Goatyard Declaration of Faith

1800s
 1812 Former Articles
 1833 New Hampshire Confession of Faith 
 1834 A Treatise on the Faith of the Freewill Baptists
 1858 The Abstract of Principles
 1866 Compend of Christian Doctrines Held by Baptists
 1878 The Articles of Faith of the Gospel Standard Aid and Poor Relief Societies (Strict Baptist) — an expression of Hyper-Calvinism

1900s
 1900 Fulton Confession of Faith (Primitive Baptists)
 1923 Articles of Faith Put Forth by the Baptist Union of America
 1925 Baptist Faith and Message - revised in 1963, 1998 and 2000
 1935 Treatise on the Faith and Practice of the Free Will Baptists
1985 Doctrinal Statement of the Brazilian Baptists, 1985, Brazilian Baptist Convention.

Other resources
Baptist Confessions of Faith
Reformed Reader - Historic Baptist Documents

References

Confessions